Jiya (Uyghur:   / Җия / ) is a township in the northeastern part of Hotan City in Hotan Prefecture, Xinjiang, China in an oasis area on the eastern bank of the White Jade River in the southwestern part of the Taklamakan Desert. To the north and east, Jiya borders Lop County, the county which Jiya was a part of until 2006, and to the south and west, Jiya borders the rest of Hotan city.

Name
According to the traditions of local residents, 'Jiya' means "land washed out by river water" (""); the land in the original path of rivers is fertile.

History
In 1984, Jiya was established as a township.

On July 11, 2006, Jiya and Yurungqash (Yulongkashi), originally part of Lop County, as well as and Tusalla (Tushala), originally part of Hotan County, were transferred to Hotan City.

In 2014, Tuanjiexin (Tuanjie Xincun) was made a village in Jiya. In 2014–5, the name for the village of Maidirisiboyi was changed to Aidelaisi.

In 2015–6, Jinye and Yuye were made villages in Jiya.

In 2019, 288,000 yuan was spent to help twenty-eight adjacent poor families with grape growing in Jiya's Suyalangan (Suya Langancun) village.

Administrative divisions
, Jiya included twenty-two villages:

Villages (Mandarin Chinese Hanyu Pinyin-derived names, except where Uyghur is provided):
Tawu'azi
Suyayujimaileke (Suya Yujimai Lekecun)
Outunqiyaole
Kuoqia
Suyalangan (Suya Langancun)
Bashilangan
Kumubage (Kumu Bagecun)
Ailimatamu (Ailima Tamucun)
Jilega'airike (Jilega Airikecun)
Kutazimaili ( (Kuotazi Mailicun))
Akemaili (Akemailicun)
Xiakemaili (Xiake Mailicun)
Azinaibazha (Azinai Bazhacun)
Tierekelike (Tiereke Likecun)
Ke'erpamaili
Aidelaisi
Kaltetügmen / Kaletatugeman (Kaleta Tugemancun;  / )
Yatugeman (Yatu Gemancun)
Bashitugeman (Bashi Tugemancun)
Tuanjiexin
Jinye
Yuye

In 2009, villages in the township included (Mandarin Chinese Hanyu Pinyin-derived names):

 Tawu'azi, Suyayujimaileke, Outunqiyaole, Kuoqia, Suyalangan, Bashilangan, Kumubage, Ailimatamu, Jilega'airike, Kutazimaili, Akemaili, Xiakemaili, Azinaibazha, Tierekelike, Ke'erpamaili, Maidirisiboyi, Kaletatugeman, Yatugeman, Bashitugeman

Economy
Jiya Township is considered the hometown of Atlas silk, which is produced in the township. Hotan Carpets are produced in the township.

Demographics

In 1997, Uyghurs made up the vast majority of the population of Jiya Township.

In 2006, the total population of Jiya Township was 19,603, with 18,688 persons in farming families. Out of the total population, 19,558 were Uyghurs (99.8%).

In 2016, out of a total population of 28,470 persons in the township, 99.77% were Uyghurs.

Transportation
 China National Highway 217

References

Populated places in Xinjiang
Township-level divisions of Xinjiang